Tourism in Singapore is a major industry and contributor to the Singaporean economy.

As of 2019, Singapore attracting 19.1 million international tourists, which was more than three times Singapore's total population. It also claims to be environmentally friendly, and maintains natural and heritage conservation programs. Along with this, it also has one of the world's lowest crime rates. As English is the dominant one of its four official languages, it is generally easier for tourists to understand when speaking to the local population of the country, for example, when shopping. Transport in Singapore exhaustively covers most, if not all public venues in Singapore, which increases convenience for tourists. This includes the well-known Mass Rapid Transit (MRT) system. Singapore is the 5th most visited city in the world, and 2nd in Asia-Pacific.

The 'Travel and Tourism Competitiveness Report 2017 ranks Singapore 13th out of 136 countries overall, which was the third best in Asia only behind Japan (ranked 4th) and Hong Kong (ranked 11th). The report ranks Singapore's business environment, international openness, also travel and tourism policy and enabling conditions as the best in the world (ranked 1st). However, the island nation scored rather low in natural and cultural resources sub-index (ranked 40th).

History

In January 1964, the Singapore Tourism Board (then known as Singapore Tourist Promotion Board), was set up to market Singapore, then a British colony, as a destination for tourists, to develop and to regulate the tourism industry. The Government of Singapore had aimed to create more jobs, income and to facilitate trade within Singapore, through the development of the tourism industry. Throughout the 1960s to 70s, the tourism board ran multiple advertising campaigns aimed at drawing visitors from different countries and published monthly newsletters to promote multiple attractions in Singapore. The Merlion was also created as the Singapore Tourism Board's logo in 1964 and was used in promotional materials.  The Merlion eventually became a well-known Singaporean icon and in 1972, a Merlion statue was erected in the Merlion Park. In 1977, there was a record of 1.5 million visitors to the country and tourist receipts were estimated to be S$628 million as compared to 522,000 visitors and S$269 million in tourist expenditure in 1970.

Throughout the 1980s to 1990s, the tourism board aimed to market the culture of Singapore to visitors through the renewal of infrastructure in historical areas such as Chinatown and development of new venues for hosting concerts and conventions. In 2005, the government of Singapore announced the development of 2 integrated resorts in Marina South and Sentosa. Plans to develop Gardens by the Bay were also announced in that same year. The resorts were part of plans to boost the tourism industry which had been facing intense competition from other destinations around the region, particularly from nearby Bangkok and Hong Kong, which has since also considered legalisation of casinos in the wake of initiatives in Singapore. Marina Bay Sands was officially opened on 23 June 2010, while Gardens by the Bay opened on June 29, 2012 and Resorts World Sentosa was officially opened on December 7, 2012.

Tourism statistics

Visitor arrivals to Singapore has been increasing since the country's independence in 1965. As compared to a total of 99,000 visitors recorded in 1965, Singapore attracted approximately 19.1 million visitors in 2019 with receipts at S$27.7 billion, according to preliminary figures by the Singapore Tourism Board. The total number of visitors increased by 3.3% from 2018, with increased in arrivals in visitors from China, Indonesia and Australia, while visitors from India and Malaysia dropped 2% and 3% respectively. Tourism receipts increased 2.8% from 2018, with most visitors spending in the sightseeing, entertainment and gaming (S$1,593 million), shopping (S$1.457 million), accommodation (S$1.439 million) and food & beverage (S$649 million) categories.

In 2020, due to the COVID-19 pandemic, visitor statistics in Singapore fell 85.7% and tourism receipts fell 82.6% (S$4.8 million) from 2019. A total of 2,700,000 visitors were recorded that year, which was the first time visitor statistics fell since the decrease in arrivals in 2014. Visitors coming into Singapore for short-term visits were also barred from entering and transiting from March 23, 2020 to October 19, 2021.

In 2021, visitors arrivals further dipped to 330,059 visitors, which was a 88% decrease as compared to 2020. Due to the spread of various COVID-19 variants, many countries still had travel restrictions, with some governments banning travel completely to curb transmission. Travel into Singapore for short-term visits were only resumed in September, 2021 with the introduction of vaccinated travel lanes.

General trends

Recent years

Top markets 2000–2010
Source: Singapore Tourism Analytics Network

Top markets 2011–2020
Source: Singapore Tourism Analytics Network, Singapore Tourism Board

Top markets 2021–present
Source: Singapore Tourism Analytics Network

Challenges to the tourism industry
Tourism impact of COVID-19 pandemic (2020-2021)
In early 2020, COVID-19 pandemic has affected the numbers of foreign visitors across the country. In February 2020, Indonesia raised its travel alert for Singapore to level yellow, urging Indonesian citizens to take extra precautions when they visit the city-state. Indonesia is among the top source of foreign visitors to Singapore. It is predicted that the number of visitors could fall between 25 and 30 percent from the 2019 figure.

On 16 September 2020, Trade and Industry Minister Chan Chun Sing has announced that all adult Singaporeans will get $100 tourism vouchers, accessible digitally via Singpass, to be used from December 2020 to June 2021. The $320 million SingapoRediscovers Vouchers scheme is part of the government's effort to prop up the tourism sector, which has been decimated by travel restrictions amidst COVID-19 pandemic.

In April 2022 same day as the U.K., Ireland, Finland, Malaysia and other countries, COVID-19 tourism impact in Singapore was officially ended by early April 2022 as the country ahead of endemic phase.

Popular tourists destinations
The Orchard Road district, which is dominated by multi-storey shopping centres and hotels, can be considered the centre of tourism in Singapore. Other popular tourist attractions include the Singapore Zoo, River Wonders and Night Safari (which allows people to explore Asian, African and American habitats at night without any visible barriers between guests and the wild animals). The Singapore Zoo has embraced the 'open zoo' concept whereby animals are kept in enclosures, separated from visitors by hidden dry or wet moats, instead of caging the animals, while the River Wonders, features 10 different ecosystems around the world, including the River Nile, Yangtze River, Mississippi, Amazon as well as the Tundra and has 300 species of animals, including numerous endangered species.

Jurong Bird Park is another zoological garden centred on birds, which is dedicated towards exposing the public to as much species and varieties of birds from around the world as possible, including a flock of one thousand flamingos. The tourist island of Sentosa, which attracted 19 million visitors in 2011, is located in the south of Singapore, consists of about 20–30 landmarks, such as Fort Siloso, which was built as a fortress to defend against the Japanese during World War II.

Guns from the World War II era can be seen at Fort Siloso, from a mini-sized to a 16 pound (7 kg) gun. Moreover, the island has built the Tiger Sky Tower, which allows visitors to view the whole of Sentosa, as well as the Sentosa Luge, a small one- or two-person sled on which one sleighs supine and feet-first. Steering is done by shifting the weight or pulling straps attached to the sled's runners. Among the latest tourists attractions built in Singapore includes the two integrated resorts which houses casinos, namely Marina Bay Sands and Resorts World Sentosa, a Universal Studios theme park and Gardens by the Bay.

Shopping

There are various shopping belts in Singapore, Marina Bay, Bugis Street, Chinatown, Geylang Serai, Kampong Gelam & Arab Street, Little India, North Bridge Road, Orchard Road, and The Suburbs.

Singapore seeks to be the business hub of Southeast Asia and has an expansive shopping precinct located in the Orchard Road district. Many multistorey shopping centres are located at Orchard Road; the area also has many hotels, and it's the main tourism centre of Singapore, other than the Downtown Core. The local populace also use Orchard Road for shopping extensively.

Island resorts

Sentosa is a relatively large island of Singapore located to its south. Along with a beach-front resort, the island's tourist attractions include Fort Siloso, its historical museum, the SEA Aquarium, and Madame Tussauds Singapore. Singapore also features two casinos (integrated resorts), one the Marina Bay Sands and the other, Resorts World Sentosa (home to Universal Studios Singapore and Adventure Cove Waterpark).

Cultural and historical landmarks

A former British colony, Singapore has various historical and cultural landmarks with British and regional influences in its architecture. Such cultural landmarks include the Masjid Sultan, one of Singapore's most important mosques which was completed in 1826. The Thian Hock Keng Temple, one of Singapore's oldest Chinese temples, which was completed in 1839 and the Sri Mariamman Temple, which was built in 1827, making it the oldest Hindu temple in Singapore. Other historical monuments include the Kranji War Memorial, Civilian War Memorial, Victoria Theatre and Concert Hall, Yueh Hai Ching Temple, Lian Shan Shuang Lin Monastery and Istana Kampong Glam.

Singapore has four major museums depicting the art and history of the country and of the region. The Asian Civilisations Museum specialises in the material history of China, Southeast Asia, South Asia and West Asia, from which the diverse ethnic groups of Singapore trace their ancestry, while the Peranakan Museum, the first of its kind in the world, explores Peranakan cultures in Singapore and other former Straits Settlements in Malacca and Penang, and other Peranakan communities in Southeast Asia. Singapore's National Museum of Singapore is the oldest museum in the country, with its history dating back to 1849, mainly showcases collections of nation-building and the history of Singapore from the 14th century in a story-telling approach, while the Singapore Art Museum is a contemporary art museum focusing on art practices in Singapore, Southeast Asia and Asia. Other smaller museums include Changi Museum, which showcases collection of paintings, photographs and personal effects donated by former POWs (Prisoners of War) during the Japanese Occupation of Singapore and the Mint Museum of Toys, which has a collection of 3,000 toys and childhood memorabilia from the mid-19th century to mid-20th Century.

City sight-seeing
Sightseeing Bus fleet
Historically, their fleet were made up of second-hand step-entrance double deckers in 2001–2004 for the City Sightseeing/Singapore Ducktours operation in Singapore, but new open-top buses were arrived beginning January 2006. Their electronic destination displays were added since January 2006 to replace roller-blinds in stages, which uses Mobitec MobiLED in larger font. , Singapore Ducktours has 66 buses (only 3 of them are hybrid buses), Big Bus Company has 20 buses, Golden Tours/Gray Line has 18 buses and Singapore City Tours have 12 buses.

Sightseeing Bus Routes

Boat fleet
 5 Condiesel Larc V (Originally from Singapore Armed Forces, withdrawn in 2000 and converted in 2002)

Nature sight-seeing

Singapore has a variety of parks and projects which often feature its natural tropical environment.

Singapore has three zoos, namely, the Singapore Zoo, Night Safari and River Wonders. The Singapore Zoo displays animals in 'open' naturalistic, spacious, landscaped enclosures separated from the visitors by hidden barriers, moats, and glass, with various shows and events occurring throughout the day to allow visitors to interact with the animals. Night Safari is the world's first nocturnal zoo, set in a humid tropical forest that is only open at night, it is divided into seven geographical zones, which can be explored either on foot via four walking trails, or by tram. River Wonders features a tropical rainforest setting and features 10 different ecosystems around the world, with 5000 animals of 300 species. Among the main attractions in the River Wonders is a pair of male and female giant pandas – Kai Kai (凯凯) and Jia Jia (嘉嘉) – which are housed in a specially constructed climate-controlled enclosure which change throughout the four seasons emulating their original environment.

Among the various gardens and parks located in the country, Singapore's Singapore Botanic Gardens, Jurong Bird Park and Gardens by the Bay are most popular amongst tourists. The Singapore Botanical Gardens, a UNESCO World Heritage Site is a 52 hectares tropical garden, among its main attractions includes the National Orchid collection with over 3000 types of orchids growing. Jurong Bird Park, is a bird zoo with extensive specimens of exotic bird life from around the world, including a flock of one thousand flamingos. The bird park is largest in the world in terms of the number of birds and is the largest such bird park in Asia. Gardens by the Bay, designed as a series of large tropical leaf-shaped gardens, each with its own specific landscaping design, character and theme. Its main attractions are the two conservatories, the Flower Dome, which replicates a mild, dry climate and features plants found in the Mediterranean and other semi-arid tropical regions, and the Cloud Forest, which replicates the cool moist conditions found in tropical mountain regions between 1,000 metres (3,300 ft) and 3,000 metres (9,800 ft) above sea level, found in South-East Asia, Middle- and South America. Other main attractions include the Supertree Grove, which features tree-like structures, known as Supertrees that dominate the Gardens' landscape. They are vertical gardens that perform a multitude of functions, which include planting, shading and working as environmental engines for the gardens.

Singapore also has two ASEAN Heritage Parks, which are the Bukit Timah Nature Reserve, an extensive nature reserve which covers much of the Bukit Timah Hill, and is the only remaining place where primary rainforest still exists on the island, and the Sungei Buloh Wetland Reserve, which is known for its high variety of bird species, crabs, mudskippers and flora and fauna.<ref>[http://www.sbwr.org.sg/aboutus/ourhistory/ Sungei Buloh History] , Official Site, retrieved 3 June 2009.</ref>

Pulau Ubin, is an offshore island situated in the north-eastern island group, is one of the last rural areas to be found in Singapore, where the last of undeveloped kampongs (villages) and wooden jetties, abandoned quarries and plantations, with an abundance of natural flora and fauna. The island forms part of the Ubin–Khatib Important Bird Area (IBA), identified as such by BirdLife International because it supports significant numbers of visiting and resident birds, some of which are threatened. One of the more popular spots on the island is, Chek Jawa, a previous coral reef 5000 years ago, where several ecosystems can be observed in one area.

Dining

The cuisine of Singapore is often viewed by its population as a prime example of the ethnic diversity of the culture of Singapore. In Singapore's hawker centres – a technical misnomer, to be precise – for example, traditionally Malay hawker stalls selling halal food may serve halal versions of traditionally Tamil or Chinese food. Chinese stalls may introduce Malay or Indian ingredients, cooking techniques or entire dishes into their range of catering. Some dishes introduce elements from all three cultures, while others incorporate influences from the rest of Asia and the West.

This phenomenon makes the cuisine of Singapore significantly rich and a cultural attraction. Much prepared food is available in the hawker centres or food courts (e.g. Lau Pa Sat, Newton Food Centre) rather than actual restaurants.  These centres are relatively abundant which often leads to low prices, and encourages a large consumer base.

Food in itself has been heavily promoted as an attraction for tourists, and is usually promoted by various initiatives undertaken by the Singapore Tourism Board or the associations it deals with as one of Singapore's best attractions alongside shopping. The government organises the Singapore Food Festival in July annually to celebrate Singapore's cuisine. The multiculturalism of local food, the ready availability of international cuisine, and their wide range in prices to fit all budgets at all times of the day and year helps create a "food paradise" to rival other contenders claiming the same moniker. The availability of variety of food is often aided by the fact Singapore's port lies along strategic routes. Catherine Ling of CNN listed Fish soup bee hoon, Bak kut teh, Chilli crab, Nasi Padang, Hainanese chicken rice, and Kaya toast as some of the "40 Singapore foods we can't live without".

There is also a proliferation of fast-food chains, such as McDonald's, Pizza Hut, KFC, Burger King, Subway, Long John Silver's, Mos Burger, Five Guys and Shake Shack.

Halal and vegetarian food are also easily available.

Tourist events

Singapore Tourism Board promotes a variety of events all year round for tourists. Some of the anchor events are the Chingay Parade, Singapore Arts Festival and Singapore Garden Festival.
The Singapore Food Festival is held every July to celebrate Singapore's cuisine. Other annual events include the Singapore Sun Festival, the Christmas Light Up, and the Singapore Jewel Festival.
Singapore hosted a round of the 2008 FIA Formula One World Championship (Singapore Grand Prix). The race, held on a new street circuit at Marina Bay, was the first night-time event in Formula One history. The event was considered an overall success due to the sheer amount of organisation, planning and hard work put into the event. Also in 2010, Singapore hosted the inaugural Youth Olympic Games, where the Singapore Tourism Board (STB), which say the Games is expected to generate a minimum of 180,000 visitor nights for Singapore.

See also

 Visa policy of Singapore
 Communications in Singapore
 Culture of Singapore
 History of Singapore
 History of the Republic of Singapore
 Landmark sites in Singapore
 Media of Singapore
 Singapore Tourism Board
 Transport in Singapore

References

External links

 
 Singapore Tourism Board
 VisitSingapore.com – The official destination website of Singapore

 

bn:সিঙ্গাপুর#পর্যটন